Scinax maracaya is a species of frog in the family Hylidae.
It is endemic to Brazil.
Its natural habitats are moist savanna, freshwater marshes, and intermittent freshwater marshes.
It is threatened by habitat loss.

References

maracaya
Endemic fauna of Brazil
Amphibians described in 1980
Taxonomy articles created by Polbot